Jane Broadbent is the Deputy Vice-Chancellor and Provost of Roehampton University.

Broadbent was born on 3 March 1952 in Barnsley, England. Prior to her appointment at Roehampton University, Broadbent held the position of Senior Vice-Principal (Academic Affairs) at Royal Holloway, University of London.

Her published academic work includes more than 60 refereed publications and has focussed on performance management, with particular reference to the UK public sector and the Private Finance Initiative (PFI). Her work has been funded by the Chartered Institute of Management Accountants and the Australian Research Council.

She is editor of the journal Public Money and Management and holds the following positions:

 Vice-Chair, Research Board of Association of Chartered Certified Accountants
 Associate editor, Accounting, Auditing & Accountability Journal
 Associate editor, British Accounting Review
 Associate editor, Journal of Accounting & Organisational Change
 Editorial Board Member, Critical Perspectives on Accounting

References

Living people
Academics of the University of Roehampton
Academics of Royal Holloway, University of London
1952 births
People from Barnsley